Tenacibaculum maritimum is a bacterium from the genus of Tenacibaculum. Tenacibaculum maritimum can cause skin infections in marine fish. The disease caused by Tenacibaculum maritimum is called Tenacibaculosis.

References

Further reading

External links
 microbewiki

Flavobacteria
Bacteria described in 1979